Harry Kemelman (November 24, 1908 – December 15, 1996) was an American mystery writer and a professor of English. He was the creator of the fictitious religious sleuth Rabbi David Small.

Early life
Harry Kemelman was born in Boston, Massachusetts, in 1908.

After receiving a B.A. in English Literature from Boston University and an M.A. in English philology from Harvard, he taught at a number of schools before World War II. During the war, Kemelman worked as wage administrator for the United States Army Transportation Corps in Boston and later for the War Assets Administration. Following the war, he was a freelance writer and private businessman. In 1963 he became assistant professor of English at the Benjamin Franklin Institute of Technology in Boston. He was also an assistant professor at Boston State College in the 1960s.

Writing career
His writing career began with short stories for Ellery Queen's Mystery Magazine featuring New England college professor Nicky Welt, the first of which, "The Nine Mile Walk", is considered a classic.

The Rabbi Small series began in 1964 with the publication of Friday the Rabbi Slept Late, which became a huge bestseller, a difficult achievement for a religious mystery, and won Kemelman a 1965 Edgar Award for Best First Novel. The Rabbi Small books are not only mysteries, but also considerations of Conservative Judaism.

Adaptations
Kemelman also received $35,000 for the movie rights to Friday the Rabbi Slept Late, a made-for-TV adaptation of which was broadcast on NBC in 1976. The film starred Art Carney as Chief Lanigan and Stuart Margolin as Rabbi Small.  A short-lived TV series, Lanigan's Rabbi, shown as part of NBC's Mystery Movie series in January 1977, was based on the book series. Art Carney played Chief Lanigan with Bruce Solomon as Rabbi Small.

In 2003, director Alvaro Brechner shot an adaptation of The Nine Mile Walk in Toledo, Spain. The film was shown in more than 100 international film festivals, garnering several awards.

Death
Kemelman died in 1996, at the age of 88, in Marblehead, Massachusetts.

Bibliography

The Nicky Welt stories
 "The Nine Mile Walk" – 1947
 "The Straw Man" – 1950
 "The Ten O'Clock Scholar" – 1952
 "End Play" – 1950
 "Time and Time Again (The Man with Two Watches)" – 1962
 "The Whistling Tea Kettle (The Adelphi Bowl)" – 1963
 "The Bread and Butter Case (A Winter's Tale)" – 1962
 "The Man on the Ladder" – 1967
 Collected in The Nine Mile Walk – 1967

The Rabbi Small novels  
 Friday the Rabbi Slept Late – 1964
 Saturday the Rabbi Went Hungry – 1966
 Sunday the Rabbi Stayed Home – 1969
 Monday the Rabbi Took Off – 1972
 Tuesday the Rabbi Saw Red – 1973
 Wednesday the Rabbi Got Wet – 1976
 Thursday the Rabbi Walked Out – 1978
 Conversations with Rabbi Small – 1981 (largely a dialogue about Judaism with a young couple Small meets on vacation)
 Someday the Rabbi Will Leave – 1985
 One Fine Day the Rabbi Bought a Cross – 1987
 The Day the Rabbi Resigned – 1992
 That Day the Rabbi Left Town – 1996

Non-fiction
 Common Sense in Education – 1970

References

External links 
 

1908 births
1996 deaths
American mystery writers
Edgar Award winners
Writers from Boston
Boston University College of Arts and Sciences alumni
Boston State College faculty
Harvard University alumni
Benjamin Franklin Institute of Technology faculty
20th-century American novelists
People from Marblehead, Massachusetts
Jewish American novelists
American male novelists
20th-century American male writers
Novelists from Massachusetts
20th-century American Jews